Kim Go-eun (born July 2, 1991) is a South Korean actress. She debuted in the film A Muse (2012) where she won several Best New Actress awards in South Korea. She is also known for her role in the television series Cheese in the Trap (2016), Guardian: The Lonely and Great God (2016), The King: Eternal Monarch (2020), Yumi's Cells (2021), and Little Women (2022).

Early life and education
Kim was born in Seoul, South Korea in 1991 and in 1994, at the age of three, she moved with her family to Beijing, China. She lived there for 10 years which led to her becoming fluent in Mandarin. After watching Chen Kaige's Together many times, Kim decided she wanted to become a filmmaker, and was led to theater by chance. Upon returning to South Korea, she attended Kaywon High School of the Arts, and went on to study drama at the Korea National University of Arts.

Director Jung Ji-woo commented on Kim, saying, "She is naturally curious and brave. She's strong in a sense that she isn't influenced easily. She doesn't do things just because everyone else does it."

Career

2012: A Muse and critical acclaim
In 2012, Kim was catapulted from obscurity to the center of much media buzz when she was cast as Eun-gyo, a 17-year-old high school student who awakens the lust of two men, in A Muse. Her performance swept the Best New Actress awards that year.

The 21-year-old had never appeared in a film or TV drama before, not even in a minor role; she had only previously acted in student productions or school plays. She met A Muse director Jung Ji-woo through a circle of friends and was not even aware that auditions for the film were being held. "I ended up having an audition after chatting with the director. There wasn't even any time for me to prepare," Kim recalled. She was chosen among some 300 actresses who auditioned for the part. Jung said Kim grew up through the film, saying, "Her facial expressions in the last few scenes of the film are strikingly different from the ones in the beginning. I wanted to capture the moments when she realizes how precious she is to herself and to others," adding that she showed off qualities that can only be found in someone who is unaware of her own beauty and what she is capable of.

Describing her feelings about her profession, Kim said, "When I stood on the stage for the first time, I was so nervous that I thought it would be so hard if I had to do this for the rest of my life. But from my second performance, I felt ecstatic, as if I had wings on my back, and I never wanted to step off the stage. I keep on acting because I want to hold on to that feeling." Regarding her decision to limit her appearance in advertisements, she said, "I never thought about my image or potential endorsement deals when choosing the next film project. What worries me is what impact my appearance in commercials would have on my roles."

2013–2015: Hiatus and return to film
Despite many offers following A Muse, Kim took a break from acting and went back to college to complete her degree. She returned to the screen in 2014, showcasing her versatility in the thriller Monster where she played a developmentally disabled woman whose younger sister is murdered by a ruthless serial killer; her grief and rage drives her almost psychotic, and she plans her revenge.

In 2015, she and Kim Hye-soo were cast in Coin Locker Girl, a female-driven thriller based on 1980 Japanese novel Coin Locker Babies. She was invited to the 2015 Festival de Cannes with the director and cast for this film, her first time there. Kim next starred in martial arts period drama Memories of the Sword, in which she acted opposite her longtime role model, actress Jeon Do-yeon. This was followed by courtroom film The Advocate: A Missing Body, where she played an aggressive prosecutor; and family film Canola, about a reunion between a girl and her grandmother alongside veteran actress Youn Yuh-jung.

2016–present: Television debut and popularity
Kim made her television debut in the hit cable series Cheese in the Trap, based on the webtoon of the same title. She also contributed her vocals in the track "Attraction" by Tearliner for the drama's OST. Kim won the Baeksang Arts Award for Best New Actress Television for her performance. Later in 2016, she co-starred in Kim Eun-sook's megahit fantasy drama Guardian: The Lonely and Great God alongside Gong Yoo. The drama was a pan-Asia hit, and received critical acclaim, becoming a cultural phenomenon in South Korea. It was also the first Korean cable drama to surpass 20% in ratings, and as of June 2021, it is the fifth-highest rated Korean drama in cable television history.

In 2018, Kim made a comeback as a secondary character in the film Sunset in My Hometown directed by Lee Joon-ik. For her role as a wild country girl, Kim gained 8 kg and learned a regional dialect. The same year, she was cast in the period romance film Tune in for Love.

In 2019, Kim was cast in the fantasy drama The King: Eternal Monarch. The series hailed as one of the most anticipated series in the first half of 2020 due to its ensemble cast, renowned screenwriter, extensive publicity and more than 30 billion Won (US$25 million) production budget, setting a record on its first episode for SBS's highest Friday-Saturday drama premiere ratings and maintaining the No.1 spot on the weekly Wavve drama chart for eight consecutive weeks, but receiving criticisms for its screenplay, direction and performances leading to lower-than-expected domestic popularity in Korea compared to previous works by Kim Eun-sook.

The same year she was cast in South Korea's first ever musical film Hero, which is based on the hit musical Youngwoong. The film is based on the life of activist An Jung-geun following the assassination of Itō Hirobumi, and Kim plays the role of a former Gungnyeo turned Geisha who becomes a part of the Korean independence movement. The movie was originally scheduled to premiere in July 2020, but was delayed due to the COVID-19 pandemic.

In 2021, Kim appeared in Korea's first live action animation, romantic comedy drama Yumi's Cells. It is a tvN TV series based on eponymous webtoon.

On April 25, 2022, it was reported that Kim would hold an offline fan meeting in the second half of this year. Kim held a fan meeting to celebrate the 10th anniversary of her debut on the October 15, 2022. In addition, Gong Yoo, Rosé, Lee Min-ho, Woo Do-hwan, Park Jung-min, and Jung Hae-in appeared in a video letter, and also attended by Ahn Eun-jin, Lee Sang-yi, Ahn Bo-hyun and Park Jin-young.

Others

Ambassador roles
In 2019, Kim was named as a Chanel Ambassador for South Korea, and was later selected to be one of the seven faces for Chanel's "J12 Turns 20" campaign in 2020.

In 2019, Kim was appointed as an honorary ambassador for Korea's Ministry of Environment's Resource Circulation held at the Korea Press Center on August 30, 2019.

Philanthropy
In April 2019, Kim donated  million (approx. US$17,460) for the victims in the Gangwon Province Wildfire. In late February 2020, the Korean NGO Good Neighbors published that she had made a donation of  million (approx. US$82,640) to provide 40,000 masks for low-income families in South Korea amidst the COVID-19 pandemic. In honor of Korean National Children's day, she donated  million won (approx. $44,000) to the Children's Hospital of the Seoul National University Hospital on May 5, 2021.

On March 5, 2022, Kim donated  million to help villagers affected by the Uljin wildfire through the National Disaster Mitigation Association (Hope Bridge). On August 11, 2022, Kim donated  to help those affected by the 2022 South Korean floods through the Hope Bridge Korea Disaster Relief Association. To celebrated her 10th anniversary since her debut, Kim donated  million to Seoul National University Children's Hospital in October 2022.

On February 9, 2023, Kim donated 30 million won to help 2023 Turkey–Syria earthquake, by donating money through NGO specializing in children's rights worldwide.

Filmography

Film

Television series

Television shows

Discography

Fanmeetings
 Go-eun Day (2017)
 Go-eun Day: Come In Closer (2022)

Awards and nominations

Listicles

References

External links

 
 
 

1991 births
Living people
21st-century South Korean actresses
Korea National University of Arts alumni
South Korean film actresses
South Korean television actresses
Actresses from Seoul
South Korean expatriates in China
Best New Actress Paeksang Arts Award (television) winners